The Silence of Dean Maitland is an 1886 novel by Maxwell Gray.

The Silence of Dean Maitland may also refer to:
 The Silence of Dean Maitland (1914 film)
 The Silence of Dean Maitland (1934 film)